Odontoxiphidium is a genus of meadow katydids in the family Tettigoniidae and tribe Conocephalini. There is one described species in Odontoxiphidium, O. apterum, from the South-Eastern USA.

References

Further reading

 

Conocephalinae
Articles created by Qbugbot